Comarques Gironines is one of the seven territories defined by the Regional Plan of Catalonia. It is located in the north-east of Catalonia and will be formed by seven comarques: Gironès, Selva, Pla de l'Estany, Garrotxa, Ripollès, Alt Empordà and Baix Empordà.

References

Geography of Catalonia
Functional territorial sections of Catalonia